William Glen (18 July 1903 – 29 May 1981) was an Irish footballer.

He joined Shamrock Rovers in their maiden season in League of Ireland football in 1922 and went on to spend fifteen years at Glenmalure Park winning everything the domestic game had to offer.

Sacky played in the official opening of the Milltown ground on the 19 September 1926 against Belfast Celtic F.C.

He played in a record ten FAI Cup finals plus four replays. His first was in 1922 when Rovers lost to St James's Gate F.C. and his last was in the 1939 final replay when he scored the only goal for Shelbourne against Sligo Rovers. Along with Johnny Fullam he shares the record for most winners' medals.

He won eight caps for the Irish Free State making his debut on the 23 April 1927 in Ireland's first ever home game at Lansdowne Road and captaining his country in his last four caps in 1935 and 1936.

He was part of the team that went unbeaten in 1924/25 and 1926/27 and scored a total of 32 league goals for the Hoops. He earned two League of Ireland XI caps in 1930.

Glen had three benefit games in his honour, one of which was at Dalymount Park in May 1937.

Honours
 League of Ireland: 4
 Shamrock Rovers - 1922–23, 1924–25, 1926–27, 1931–32
 FAI Cup: 8
 Shamrock Rovers - 1925, 1929, 1930, 1931, 1932, 1933, 1936
 Shelbourne - 1939
League of Ireland Shield: 5
 Shamrock Rovers - 1924/25, 1926/27, 1931/32, 1932/33, 1934/35
Leinster Senior Cup: 5
 Shamrock Rovers - 1923, 1927, 1929, 1930, 1933
Leinster Senior League: 1
 Shamrock Rovers - 1921–22

Sources

References

1903 births
1981 deaths
Association footballers from County Dublin
Republic of Ireland association footballers
Irish Free State international footballers
Shamrock Rovers F.C. players
Shelbourne F.C. players
League of Ireland players
League of Ireland XI players
Leinster Senior League (association football) players
Association football defenders